The 2019–20 Michigan Wolverines men's hockey team was the Wolverines' 98th season. They represent the University of Michigan in the 2019–20 NCAA Division I men's ice hockey season. The team was coached by Mel Pearson, in his third year as head coach, and played their home games at Yost Ice Arena.

On March 12, 2020, the Big Ten announced that the tournament was cancelled due to the coronavirus pandemic.

Previous season
During the 2018–19 ice hockey season, Michigan went 13–16–7, including 9–10–5 in Big Ten play. Michigan lost in the quarterfinals of the 2019 Big Ten Men's Ice Hockey Tournament to Minnesota in two games.

Roster
As of October 28, 2019

Coaching staff

Standings

Schedule and results

|-
!colspan=12 style=";" | Exhibition

|-
!colspan=12 style=";" | Regular Season

|-
!colspan=12 style=";" | 

|-
!colspan=12 style=";" | Regular Season

|-
!colspan=12 style=";" | 

|- style="background:#bbbbbb"
| March 14
| 5:30 PM
| at Ohio State
|
| Value City Arena • Columbus, OH
| colspan=5 rowspan=1 style="text-align:center"|Canceled due to the coronavirus pandemic

Scoring statistics

Goaltending statistics

Rankings

Players drafted into the NHL

2020 NHL Entry Draft

† incoming freshman

References

External links
 Official Website

Michigan Wolverines men's ice hockey seasons
Michigan
Michigan
Michigan ice hockey
Michigan ice hockey